The battle of Christmas Island was a small engagement which began on 31 March 1942, during World War II. Assisted by a mutiny of soldiers of the British Indian Army against their British officers, Imperial Japanese Army troops were able to occupy Christmas Island without any land-based resistance. The United States Navy submarine  caused severe damage to the Imperial Japanese Navy cruiser  during the landings.

Background

It was a good control post for the east Indian Ocean and it was an important source of phosphates, which were needed by Japanese industry. Since 1900, the island had been mined for its phosphate, and at the time of the battle there was a large labour force, consisting of 1,000 Chinese and Malays working under the supervision of a small group of British overseers. In addition, there were about 100 women and 200 children on the island.

After the occupation of Java, Japanese Imperial General Headquarters issued orders for "Operation X" (the invasion and occupation of Christmas Island) on 14 March 1942. Rear Admiral Shōji Nishimura was assigned to command the Second Southern Expeditionary Fleet's occupation force, with the light cruiser  as his flagship.

Opposing this invasion force was a single  gun that had been built in 1900 and had been mounted on Christmas Island in 1940. The British garrison—a detachment of the Hong Kong and Singapore Royal Artillery—numbered 32 troops. It was led by a British officer, Captain L. W. T. Williams. Williams' force consisted of an Indian officer, Subadar Muzaffar Khan; 27 Punjabi Indian gunners and non-commissioned officers (NCOs); and four British enlisted men.

A group of Punjabi troops, apparently believing Japanese propaganda concerning the liberation of India from British rule, and probably acting with the tacit support of some or all of the local Sikh police officers, mutinied. On 11 March, they shot and killed Williams and the four British enlisted men – Sergeants Giles and Cross and Gunners Thurgood and Tate – and tossed their bodies into the sea. They then locked up the district officer and the few other European inhabitants of the island pending an execution that apparently was thwarted by the Japanese occupation.

Battle

At dawn on 31 March 1942, a dozen Japanese bombers launched the attack, destroying the radio station. The mutineers signalled their intention to surrender, raising a white flag before the 850-man landing force had come ashore. The Japanese expeditionary corps was able to disembark at Flying Fish Cove without opposition.

At 09:49 the same morning, the US Navy submarine  fired four torpedoes at the Naka; all missed. Seawolf attacked again at 06:50 the following morning, firing three torpedoes at Natori, missing again. The damage was severe enough that Naka had to be towed back to Singapore by Natori, and eventually was forced to return to Japan for a year of repairs. Following the hit, the other Japanese vessels depth charged the US submarine for over nine hours but it escaped.

Natori returned to Christmas Island and withdrew all elements of the occupation force, with the exception of a 20-man garrison detachment, to Banten Bay, Indonesia, on 3 April 1942. The Japanese gained phosphate rock which was loaded on the transport ships.

Aftermath
Following the occupation, the Japanese garrison attempted to put the Chinese and Malays to work, although many escaped further inland to live off the land. The mutineers also became labourers, being employed to clean storage bins. Production was only very limited after the occupation and after the 17 November 1942 sinking of the Nissei Maru by the submarine  while unloading at the wharf, phosphate production was halted altogether. Over 60 percent of the island's population, including the European prisoners, were relocated to Java by December 1943. After the war, Christmas Island was reoccupied by the UK in mid-October 1945.

In the post war period, seven Punjabi mutineers were traced and court-martialled in Singapore. The first six to be identified and tried were convicted on 13 March 1947. Five were sentenced to death, and one was sentenced to two years' imprisonment and discharge with ignominy. King George VI confirmed the death sentences on 13 August 1947. British rule in India ended shortly afterward, with India gaining independence and Pakistan being created before the executions could be carried out, and thus diplomatic issues had to be taken into account. In October 1947, a seventh mutineer was identified. He was also court-martialled and sentenced to death. An eighth soldier was identified as a participant in the mutiny but was never caught. On 8 December 1947, the death sentences were commuted to penal servitude for life after the governments of India and Pakistan made representations. After further arguments between the UK and Pakistan over where the sentences should be served, with the British demanding they serve nine years, the six prisoners were transferred to Pakistan in June 1955, after which the British government ended its interest in the case.

See also
Cocos Islands mutiny

References

Bibliography

External links

Conflicts in 1942
1942 in Australia
1942 in Japan
Battles of World War II involving Japan
World War II operations and battles of the Southeast Asia Theatre
Military history of Australia during World War II
Naval battles of World War II involving the United States
Christmas Island
Battles and conflicts without fatalities
20th century in Christmas Island
Battles and operations of World War II involving India
Military history of Malaya during World War II
March 1942 events
April 1942 events
Military history of India during World War II
Mutinies